Thorbjörnsson may refer to:

Markus Thorbjörnsson
Guðmundur Þorbjörnsson